A Grammar of the Bengal Languages is a 1778 modern Bengali grammar book written in English by Nathaniel Brassey Halhed. This is the first grammar book of the Bengali language. The book, published in 1778, was probably printed from the Endorse Press in Hooghly, Bengal Presidency.

See also
 Bengali grammar

References

External links

 A Grammar Of The Bengal Language — archive.org
 A Grammar of the Bengal Language — Google Books
 A Grammar of the Bengal Language – Preview — Google Books
 Bengali Language Collection — National Library of India
 Earliest printed books in select languages, Part 2: 1501–1897 — Britannica

1778 non-fiction books
Indian books
Bengali grammar
Books by Nathaniel Brassey Halhed
Grammar books